Otto Treßler, also Otto Tressler, (13 April 1871 – 27 April 1965) was a German-Austrian stage and film actor. He appeared in more than 40 films between 1915 and 1962. He was born in Stuttgart, Germany and died in Vienna, Austria. He was a close friend to Archduchess Maria Josepha of Austria.

Partial filmography

 The Story of a Maid (1921) - Leopold
 Frau Dorothys Bekenntnis (1921)
 Das Weib des Irren (1921) - Graf
 Children of Darkness (1921, part 1, 2) - Schiffskapitän Pool
 Die Narrenkappe der Liebe (1921) - Spieler
 Pflicht und Ehre (1924)
 Le fauteuil 47 (1926) - Le baron Lebret
 The Crimson Circle (1929) - Ministerpräsident
 Storm in a Water Glass (1931) - Gerichtsvorsitzender
 Gently My Songs Entreat (1933) - Graf Esterhaazy
 The Racokzi March (1933) - Der Regimentsarzt
 When You're Young, the World Belongs to You (1934) - Rossani
 The Island (1934) - Der Botschafter
 Abenteuer eines jungen Herrn in Polen (1934) - Graf Lubenski
 Episode (1935) - Otto Torresani
 Die Pompadour (1935) - Cicerone
 The Court Concert (1936) - Lord Melbourne
 Victoria in Dover (1936) - Landesfürst Serenissimus
 Dangerous Game (1937) - Rosys Großvater Gustav Adolf Martini
 Maria Papoila (1937) - Dr. Kristof
 Prinzessin Sissy (1939) - King Ludwig I. of Bavaria
 Castles in the Air (1939) - Forster
 I Am Sebastian Ott (1939) - Oberst Holzapfel
 Linen from Ireland (1939) - Präsident Kettner 
 Kameraden (1941) - Gesandter von Krusemarck
 Two Happy People (1943)
 Vienna 1910 (1943) - Graf Paar
 Romantische Brautfahrt (1944) - Josef Graf Mannsberg
 Die Zaubergeige (1944) - Landgraf von Homburg
 The Black Robe (1944) - Baron Friedberg
 Opfergang (1944) - Senator Froben
 Arlberg Express (1948) - Tschurtschrntaler
 On Resonant Shores (1948) - Abt
 Stadtpark (1951)
 Maria Theresa (1951) - Graf Aliano
 1. April 2000 (1952) - Engl. Hochkommissar
 Franz Schubert (1953)
 Victoria in Dover (1954) - Archbishop of Canterbury
 Sissi (1955) - Feldmaerschall Radetzky
 Sissi – The Young Empress (1956) - Feldmaerschall Radetzky
 Vienna, City of My Dreams (1957) - Fürst Vitus
 Forever My Love (1962) - (uncredited)

Decorations and awards
 1902: court actor
 1931: Honorary citizen of the City of Vienna
 1935: Councillor
 1937: Austrian Cross of Merit for Art and Science, First Class
 1937: Honorary Ring of the Vienna
 1938: State actor (in German: Staatsschauspieler)
 1941: Goethe Medal for Art and Science
 1942: Gold Civil Service Faithful Service Medal
 1951: Honorary Ring of the City of Vienna (Renewed presentation for war loss)
 1956: Grand Decoration of Honour for Services to the Republic of Austria
 1961: Great Cross of Merit of the Federal Republic of Germany
 1961: Freeman of the University of Vienna
 1963: Austrian Cross of Honour for Science and Art, 1st class

References

External links
 

1871 births
1965 deaths
20th-century German male actors
20th-century Austrian male actors
German male stage actors
German male film actors
German male silent film actors
Austrian male film actors
Austrian male silent film actors
German expatriates in Austria
Male actors from Stuttgart
People from the Kingdom of Württemberg
Commanders Crosses of the Order of Merit of the Federal Republic of Germany
Recipients of the Grand Decoration for Services to the Republic of Austria
Recipients of the Austrian Cross of Honour for Science and Art, 1st class
Burials at Döbling Cemetery